Ivo or IVO may refer to:

People 
 Ivo, a masculine given name
 Lêdo Ivo (1924–2012), Brazilian poet
 Tommy Ivo (born 1936), American actor and drag racer

Places 
 Ivó, a village in Zetea, Romania
 Ivo, Ebonyi, a local government area of Nigeria

Other uses 
 Health and Social Care Inspectorate, of the Government of Sweden
 Hurricane Ivo (disambiguation)
 Imatran Voima, now Fortum, a Finnish energy company
 Institute for Public Affairs (Slovakia), a Slovakian think tank
 Io Volcano Observer, a proposed unmanned spacecraft